Burmester can refer to:

People
Hans-Jürgen Burmester (1916–1998), Major in the Wehrmacht during World War II
Henry Burmester Pulleine (1838–1879), administrator and commander in the British Army
Leo Burmester (1944–2007), American actor
Ludwig Burmester (1840–1927), German mathematician
Burmester's theory, named after Ludwig Burmester
Mark Burmester (born 1968), former Zimbabwe cricketer
Moss Burmester (born 1981), New Zealand 200m butterfly swimmer
O. H. E. Burmester (1897–1977), British specialist in Arabic coptology
Rudolf Burmester (1875–1956), British navy officer
Willy Burmester (1869–1933), German violinist

Places
Burmester, Utah, unincorporated community in Tooele County, Utah, United States
Burmester Dome, an ice-capped dome in the west-central Saratoga Table, Antarctica

Company
Burmester Audiosysteme, a German manufacturer of audio components founded by Dieter Burmester (1946–2015)

See also

Burmeister, a surname